Rayavaram Mandal is one of the 22 mandals in Dr. B.R. Ambedkar Konaseema District of Andhra Pradesh. As per census 2011, there are 10 villages.

Demographics 
Rayavaram Mandal has total population of 66,456 as per the Census 2011 out of which 32,982 are males while 33,474 are females and the Average Sex Ratio of Rayavaram Mandal is 1,015. The total literacy rate of Rayavaram Mandal is 69.7%. The male literacy rate is 65.9% and the female literacy rate is 60.11%.

Towns and villages

Villages 
Chelluru
Kurakallapalle
Kurmapuram
Lolla
Machavaram
Nadurubada
Pasalapudi
Someswaram
Vedurupaka
Venturu

See also 
List of mandals in Andhra Pradesh

References 

Mandals in Konaseema district
Mandals in Andhra Pradesh